The 2022 California State Controller election was held on November 8, 2022, to elect the California State Controller. Due to term limits, incumbent Democratic Controller Betty Yee was ineligible to run for a third term. Democrat Malia Cohen won the election, defeating Republican Lanhee Chen.

Candidates

Democratic Party

Advanced to general election 
 Malia Cohen, Chair of the California State Board of Equalization and former President of the San Francisco Board of Supervisors (2018–2019)

Eliminated in primary
 Ron Galperin, Los Angeles City Controller
 Steve Glazer, state senator from the 7th district
Yvonne Yiu, mayor of Monterey Park

Republican Party

Advanced to general election
 Lanhee Chen, Stanford University professor, former advisor to the NRSC, former policy advisor for Mitt Romney's 2012 presidential campaign and Marco Rubio's 2016 presidential campaign, and former member of the Social Security Advisory Board

Green Party

Eliminated in primary
Laura Wells, financial and business analyst and perennial candidate

Endorsements

Fundraising 
Of the 2022 California statewide races, the race for controller had the largest total amount of money spent.

By October 2021, Chen had received over $1 million from 307 donors, including Jerry Yang, Steve Poizner, and John T. Chambers. Glazer's campaign was financially supported by the California Chamber of Commerce. Yiu gave more than $5 million to her own campaign.

Primary election

Results

General election

Polling

Results

Notes

References 

State Controller
California State Controller elections
November 2022 events in the United States
California